Priscilla Marie Winans Love, known professionally as CeCe Winans,  (born October 8, 1964) is an American gospel singer. She rose to prominence as a member of the duo BeBe & CeCe Winans; before launching an acclaimed solo career. Winans has been awarded 15 Grammy Awards, the most for a female gospel singer; and 31 GMA Dove Awards, 16 Stellar Awards, 7 NAACP Image Awards, along with many other awards and honors to her credit. Winans is considered to be one of the greatest gospel artists of all time, the most-awarded gospel artist of all time, and is the best-selling gospel act of all time. 

She has a star on the Hollywood Walk of Fame, and has 17 million record sales certified by RIAA, and over 19 million estimated in total sales as a solo artist. Billboard magazine lists all of her solo albums as top Christian music sellers, and six albums as a duo with her older brother, BeBe Winans.

Early life
Winans was born in Detroit, Michigan, to Delores and David Winans, on October 8, 1964. She is one of 10 children. Her parents were part of the Church Of God In Christ and would only listen to gospel music. She sang her first solo at the age of 8.

Duo with BeBe Winans
Winans first went to Charlotte, North Carolina, in 1981 as a singer on the popular Christian telecast, The PTL Club, hosted by Jim and Tammy Faye Bakker. Although originally part of the larger Winans family singing group, CeCe and her older brother BeBe became a duo during their time at PTL, in response to positive reactions to their version of the song "Up Where We Belong" sung as a duet, with lyrics changed for Christian audiences. In 1984, CeCe and Bebe released their first album, Lord Lift Us Up, for PTL Records. They achieved crossover success, eventually releasing nine Gold and Platinum recordings, billed as BeBe & CeCe Winans. Winans left PTL in 1984 just before getting married. Her brother left in 1985. They released their second album in 1987: BeBe & CeCe Winans.

Solo career
Winans began her solo career with the album Alone in His Presence, released in 1995. It sold more than a million copies, and earned her a Grammy Award and two Dove Awards, including the Female Vocalist of the Year. Winans's next release, the Gold-certified Everlasting Love, was released in 1998 and featured Winans' highest-charting solo singles: "Well Alright" and "Slippin". The song "On That Day" from the album was written and produced by R&B singer Lauryn Hill. Later that year, Winans released His Gift; a holiday album.

In 1999, Winans started her own recording company, PureSprings Gospel. Her first album on the label was Alabaster Box in 1999. Some production of the disc was done by Gospel singer and musician Fred Hammond. It included a guest appearance by Take 6. In 2000 Winans released a concert VHS titled Live at the Lambs Theater in New York. The concert contained songs from her previous albums. Winans released her next album, the self-titled CeCe Winans, in 2001. The single "Anybody Wanna Pray" included a guest appearance by GRITS. The second single, "Say A Prayer" crossed over into the CCM market.

Winans took a two-year break from releasing albums and returned in 2003 with Throne Room. The first 1,000 copies were issued with a bonus CD that contained exclusive interviews with the artist, the making of the CD, some touring footage, and the music video "More Than What I Wanted" (which came from the 2001 release). In 2004, the 25-city tour Throne Room with the group Anointed featured free admission and was followed with a DVD release of the concert recorded in Tennessee. Live in the Throne Room contained tracks from all of Winans's albums. Around September 2004, Winans experienced what she thought was a flu but turned out to be a serious stomach infection and was hospitalized immediately for surgery. Due to the extended recovery time, the second half of the Throne Room Tour was postponed to early 2005.

Winans's seventh album Purified was released in 2005. Her nephew Mario Winans was one of four producers. Her son Alvin III co-wrote several songs on the album, and her younger sisters Angie and Debbie performed.

Winans' collection of Top Ten R&B radio hits include "Count On Me", her duet with Whitney Houston, from the Waiting to Exhale soundtrack. The single was certified Gold in the US and reached No. 8 on the Billboard Hot 100, No. 4 on the Adult Contemporary chart, and No. 8 on the Billboard R&B Singles chart.

Winans released her eighth album, Thy Kingdom Come on April 1, 2008, featuring the single "Waging War". On October 6, 2009, a BeBe & CeCe reunion album named Still was released by Malaco Records, and features collaborations with Marvin Winans and contemporary gospel sister duo Mary Mary.

On December 23, 2010, Winans along with Bebe and Mary Mary, featuring the West Angeles Choir, performed on The Tonight Show with Jay Leno.

From 2012 to 2014, Winans was a judge on BET's gospel singing competition, Sunday Best, along with her brother Bebe.

In 2017, Winans released a tenth album, Let Them Fall in Love, for which she won two Grammy Awards for Best Gospel Performance/Song and Best Gospel Album. In 2021 Winans released her first live worship album, Believe for It, which won her three additional Grammy Awards (including Best Gospel Album) in April 2022.

She debut her latest songs on Sept 14, 2022 known "Goodness of God."

Books
Winans has authored three books: On A Positive Note, a memoir released August 1, 2000; Throne Room: Ushered Into the Presence of God, a devotional released January 1, 2004, and co-authored with Claire Cloninger; and Always Sisters: Becoming the Princess You Were Created to Be, released on July 17, 2007, co-written with Claudia Mair Burney.

Personal life
Winans now resides in Brentwood, Tennessee, a suburb of Nashville, with her husband Alvin Love II. She has two children, a son and a daughter.

Winans was the best friend of Whitney Houston and godmother to her daughter, Bobbi Kristina Brown. On February 18, 2012, Winans performed "Don't Cry for Me" and "Jesus Loves Me" at Houston's funeral, at New Hope Baptist Church in Newark, New Jersey.

Discography
See also BeBe & CeCe Winans discography

 Alone in His Presence (1995)
 Everlasting Love (1998)
 His Gift (1998)
 Alabaster Box (1999)
 CeCe Winans (2001)
 Throne Room (2003)
 Purified (2005)
 Thy Kingdom Come (2008)
 Songs of Emotional Healing (2010)
 Let Them Fall in Love (2017)
 Something's Happening (2018)
 Believe for It (2021)

Videography

Concert

Music videos
1996: "Count On Me" (Whitney Houston & Winans) 
1998: "Well Alright" 
1998: "The River"
2001: "More Than What I Wanted" 
2017: "Dancing in the Spirit"
2018: "It's Christmas"
2020: "Never Lost"

Television appearances
This list does not include interviews or musical performances.
1994: Martin (episode: "Go Tell It on the Martin")
1997: Living Single (episode: "Oh, Solo Mio")
1997–99: CeCe's Place (on the Odyssey Channel)
2002: 7th Heaven (episode: "The Known Soldier")
2002: Doc (episode: "The Price of a Miracle")
2003–: Praise the Lord (occasional guest host)

Other

Awards and nominations

Winans has received 15 Grammy Awards (out of 31 nominations), 28 Dove Awards and 16 Stellar Awards (as well as numerous nominations). She has also been awarded 6 BET Awards, 7 NAACP Image Awards, 1 Soul Train Lady of Soul Award, a star on the Hollywood Walk of Fame, Nashville Music City Walk of Fame, and is one of the inaugural inductees into the Black Music & Entertainment Walk of Fame, and many more to her credit.

See also
The Winans Family

References

Works cited
 Winans, CeCe: On a Positive Note (August 1, 2000)

External links

August 2008 Cece Winans  Interview (BlackGospel.com)

CeCe Winans discusses On the Move curriculum

1964 births
Living people
20th-century American singers
21st-century American singers
20th-century African-American women singers
American gospel singers
American performers of Christian music
Atlantic Records artists
Singers from Detroit
Grammy Award winners
Performers of Christian contemporary R&B music
Urban contemporary gospel musicians
20th-century American women singers
21st-century American women singers
Pentecostals from Michigan
Winans family
21st-century African-American women singers